The 2016–17 UAE President's Cup was the 41st edition of the UAE President's Cup. Al-Jazira are the defending champions winning their third title in 2016 after beating Al-Ain 6-5 on penalties after a 1–1 draw.

Group stage

Preliminary Group A

Preliminary Group B

|}

Knockout stage

Round of 16

Quarter-finals

Semi-finals

Finals

Bracket
As per UAE Football Association matches database:

Statistics

Top goalscorers

Source:

References

UAE President's Cup seasons
2016–17 in Emirati football